SICPA (acronym for the former name Société Industrielle et Commerciale de Produits Alimentaires, no longer in use) is a Swiss company that provides security inks for currencies and sensitive documents, including identity documents, passports, transport and lottery tickets. According to the Counterfeiting Intelligence Bureau's International Anti-Counterfeiting Directory, SICPA provides more than 85% of the world's currency inks. The company is also involved in the market for secure traceability of products subject to excise duties, such as alcohol and tobacco stamps, and regulated products, such as halal products.

A highly secretive company, SICPA employs roughly 3,000 employees and has offices and manufacturing sites in 30 countries worldwide.

History

Beginnings 
The company was founded in 1927 by Maurice Amon (1880–1959) in Lausanne to sell Swiss agricultural products, at that time primarily milk and cream, after Amon invented a new type of milking grease that facilitated the milking process. SICPA quickly moved to inks for printers to serve the growing demand in the Lausanne region.

After World War II, Maurice Amon's sons Albert (1916–2010) and Salvador (1912–1993) directed the company towards sophisticated inks with characteristics that deter counterfeiting. In 1948, the Spanish 100 Peseta note was the first in the world to be printed using SICPA's security ink.

In 1952, SICPA established a joint venture in Lausanne with Gualtiero Giori, an Italian printing specialist. In 1965, Giori founded a company with a British competitor firm, De La Rue, the world's oldest printer of banknotes.

Worldwide expansion 
Since then, the company has extended its worldwide market reach. In 1982, the company won a contract from the US Bureau of Engraving and Printing to provide the ink for the US Dollar. In 1987, the first bank note using OVI colour-changing ink was issued in Thailand. The firm also supplied the inks for the new Euro notes in 2002.

That same year, SICPA acquired the security ink segment of American company Flint Ink.

SICPA's factory relocated to Chavornay in 1990.

The company underwent restructuring in 1996 following a failed investment in Australia. As a result, two Swiss banks, the Société de banque suisse (SBS) et la Banque cantonale vaudoise (BCV), took partial control of the firm, Albert Amon retired, and his sons Philippe and Maurice joined the board of directors.

In 2001, SICPA entered the market for authentication and traceability solutions through the launch of a "Product Safety" division, offering anti-counterfeit solutions and improving the collection of taxes on products such as tobacco, alcohol and currently also Medical cannabis.

Three years later, in 2004, the first track and trace contract was signed with the government of Malaysia. Other contracts were signed for tobacco tracing in California (2005) and Massachusetts (2010), Brazil (2007 and 2010 for beer and tobacco), Turkey (2007), Morocco (2010) and Kenya (2013).

SICPA also used to be active in the production of packaging inks, but sold that business to German company Siegwerk in 2005 for an undisclosed amount. The acquisition made Siegwerk the second largest manufacturer of packaging ink in the world.

SICPA acquired the production unit of Italian company Olivetti I-Jet in 2014, after having already purchased the R&D unit the year before. It is also present in Ecuador. Also in 2014, SICPA acquired Cabot Security Materials Inc., based out of Albuquerque, New Mexico.

With cannabis becoming legal in several US states for medical purposes, SICPA introduced its cannabis tracking program to the US, notably in California.

Organization

Key figures 
A secretive company, SICPA does not publicly communicate its business figures (number of employees, offices, location of the latter etc.). However, the firm's turnover was estimated to be $750 million in 2003. Its employees are estimated to have increased from 1,100 to 3,000 between 2007 and 2013 due to several acquisitions, 400 of which work at the company headquarters in Prilly. Resulting from internal reshuffling of two of its tracing business units, an estimated 100 employees have been made redundant since 2014. A "reorganization plan" affected 150 employees in 2017.

Governance 
From 2000 to 2003, Jean Daloglou was the CEO of the group. From 2003 to 2005 the position was held by Jan Secher. SICPA is now owned and managed by Philippe Amon, his brother Maurice Amon having left the company.

Business segments 
The company's activities are divided into three main segments:

 Inks and security technologies are the historical core business of the company, and focus on banknotes, ID documents, postage stamps, security labels, etc. The firm cooperates with the central banks of most countries.
 The company offers product and brand protection solutions and services to the industry to ensure the integrity of the supply chain. This includes integrated and multi-layer authentication solutions, burglar-proof solutions as well as identification and traceability solutions.
 The company has been providing integrated security solutions for governments since 2004. Secure traceability consists in providing a secure stamp or affixing a direct mark on products subject to excise duties, such as tobacco, alcohol or oil. This enables countries to combat tax evasion and smuggling, and plays a role in public health considerations. SICPA has developed a set of multilayer or multi-level security solutions that integrate visible and invisible physical security, and digital security with serialization (SICPATRACE).

Each year, 76 billion products are marked with SICPA inks according to the company in 2017.

Controversies 
A highly secretive company, SICPA has been regularly quoted by both media and politicians for either potential corruption practices (Brazil, Kenya and Morocco) or some of its lobbying practices (France, Ecuador), but has never been sentenced for any wrongdoing.

Americas 
In 2015, the company was accused  in Brazil in an investigation by the federal police concerning the conditions under which it was awarded the contract by Casa da Moeda. Charles Nelson Finkel, reportedly paid bribes of $32 million to finance ministry officials to secure the contract worth several billion euros. As of 2018, the case is still pending. Casa da Moeda has since elaborated on the contract award conditions in a note detailing the tendering procedure and the contract with SICPA was canceled. SICPA claims to have committed no irregularities and to be cooperating fully with the authorities. The Brazilian government continues to work with the company, particularly for the tracing of tobacco products (SCORPIOS contract), which was extended in 2017.

Kenya 
In 2016, SICPA was criticized in Kenya for the way it obtained a public contract in 2012. Raila Odinga, former Prime Minister of Kenya, accused SICPA of "illegally obtaining a contract for more than one 100 million Swiss francs from the Nairobi Finance Department (Kenya Revenue Authority, KRA)." La Tribune de Genève also reports that according to the Kenyan press SICPA "had obtained the contract well before it was added into the Kenyan trade register. It also did not meet the authorities' criteria." However, the Swiss newspaper also points out that "there is no document to support a possible malpractice in Kenya [and that] KRA is very satisfied with the services provided by SICPA". However, SICPA denied irregularities, insisting that the contract was awarded fairly. In a parliamentary hearing, Maurice Juma, director of Kenya's Public Procurement Oversight Authority (PPOA), said that "Under the procurement law, the contract was processed through fraudulent means and it cannot be sustained". However, SICPA received a temporary relieve when the PPOA attested the tender procedures prior to the awarding of the contract a "clean bill of health."

In 2018, Kenya's High Court ruled that the Kenya Revenue Authority (KRA) had not adequately followed constitutional provisions in terms of public consultation when imposing excise duties on bottled water, juices, soda and other non-alcoholic beverages. The contract the KRA had with SICPA for the supply of the duty stamps was annulled, but KRA appealed the ruling and on 11 May received permission to continue the implementation of the excise goods system.

References

Manufacturing companies of Switzerland